To date, thirty-three species of Israeli bats have been identified, of which 32 are insectivorous bats.

The largest bat hibernation site in Israel is the Twins Cave near Beit Shemesh.

One-third of the species of bats of Israel are found in the Jordan Valley region, with many inhabiting abandoned Israeli military outposts along the border with Jordan.

Beginning in the 1950s, bat caves in Israel were routinely fumigated to reduce the number of fruit bats in the country. As the population of fruit bats declined, so did that of other bat species. Consequently, the number of noctuid moths soared, resulting in extensive damage to crops.

Bat caves 
The largest bat hibernation site in Israel is the Twins Cave, south of Beit Shemesh. The cave forms part of the Twins Cave Nature Reserve.

List of bats of Israel

Insectivorous bats

Fruit bats 
Rousettus aegyptiacus

See also 
Wildlife of Israel

References

External links 
 Analysis of the distribution of insectivorous bats in Israel  – Tel Aviv University, Department of Zoology

Israel
Fauna of Israel